Hotel Fort Canning is a boutique hotel opened in 2010 in Fort Canning Park, Singapore, self-styled as "fashionable" and located near such touristy nightlife areas as Orchard Road and Clarke Quay.
The building was the former British Far East Command Headquarters during World War II. The building was restored and reconstructed as a hotel by architectural firm DP Architects which sought to maintain the old style colonial glamour and the multi-columned façade of the old headquarters.

History and conservatism

British Far East Command HQ
The military building was built in 1926 as the Administration Building of the British Far East Command HQ.  The General-Officer-Commanding, Lieutenant General Percival, had an office in this building. The building was occupied by the Japanese Military during the Occupation (1942–1945).  The British Military took it back after the war and used it as part of the British Military Administration.

Singapore Command and Staff College
The building was then taken over by the Singapore Armed Forces when Singapore became independent.  In 1970, the building was used by the Singapore Command and Staff College (SCSC).
In 1976, the SCSC moved out of the building, and it remained unoccupied until 1995, when it housed the Fort Canning Country Club.
The Legends Fort Canning Park took over the premises in November 2002, and in July 2011, it re-opened as Hotel Fort Canning.

Facilities
The hotel has 86 stylised rooms and suites.

Hotel Fort Canning's upper floor windows have wide views of Fort Canning Park and the Downtown Singapore skyline.

The hotel has two outdoor swimming pools filled with water treated by an innovative non-chlorination-based system, with none of the health issues of conventional swimming pools, a gym and Chinois Spa @ The Legends. It also has two food & beverages outlet, and 6 meeting venues with conference facilities.

Awards & Accolade
2019
Tripadvisor Travellers' Choice Award (Top 25 Luxury Hotels – Singapore)

2018
Booking.com - Guest Review Award (8.8 out of 10) 
Tripadvisor Travellers' Choice Award
Historic Hotel of the Year (Singapore), Travel & Hospitality Awards
Best Garden Solemnisation Venue (5 star), Her World Brides Venue Awards
Luxury City Hotel of the Year - Singapore, Luxury Travel Guide Awards
Top 100 Boutique Hotels - Hotels.com Loved By Guests Awards

2017
TripAdvisor Certificate of Excellence
Seven Stars Luxury Hospitality and Lifestyle Award
World Luxury Restaurant Awards, Country Winner (The Salon)
Best Solemnisation & Outdoor Reception Venue, Her World Brides Venue Awards
Best Outdoor Wedding Theme, Her World Brides Venue Awards
World Luxury Hotel Awards, Country Winner (Luxury Eco/Green Hotel)
World Luxury Hotel Awards, Country Winner (Luxury Architecture Design Hotel)
World Luxury Hotel Awards, Country Winner (Luxury Romantic Hotel)

2016
Excellent Service Awards
Haute Grandeur Global Hotel Awards
Seven Stars Luxury Hospitality and Lifestyle Award
TripAdvisor Certificate of Excellence
TripAdvisor Traveller's Choice Award
World Luxury Hotel Awards
World Luxury Restaurant Award (Nominee)

2015
World Luxury Hotel Award Winner
Her World Brides Venue Awards (Best Wedding Solemnisation Venue for Hotels - 5 Star & Above)
Tripadvisor Certificate of Excellence
BCA Green Mark Gold Plus Award Winner

2014
World Luxury Hotel Awards (Luxury Historical Hotel)
Tripadvisor Certificate of Excellence 
AsiaOne People's Choice Awards Top 3 Finalist (Best Boutique Hotel) 
Her World Brides Venue Awards (Best Wedding Solemnisation / Reception Venue for Hotels - 5 Star & Above)
AsiaRooms.com Hotel Awards – Top 10 Most Cultural Hotel (SEA)
EXSA Service Excellence Awards – 5 Silver Awardees
Booking.com Guest Review Award Winner

2013
Tripadvisor Certificate of Excellence
Tripadvisor Travellers' Choice Award

2012
Top 20 Trendiest Hotels in Singapore
TripAdvisor's Certificate of Excellence
TripAdvisor Traveller's Choice Award

2011
Winner of the "URA Architectural Heritage Award". 
Destinasian Luxe List of 2011
Top Signature Boutique Hotel / Resort, Hospitality Asia Platinum Awards
TripAdvisor Traveller's Choice Award

References

External links
 Hotel Fort Canning web site

Hotels in Singapore
Tourist attractions in Singapore
Museum Planning Area
2010 establishments in Singapore